Erik André Huseklepp (born 5 September 1984) is a Norwegian professional football coach and former player who is currently assistant coach at Brann. A former forward, he previously played for Fyllingen and Brann in Norway, for Bari in Italy, and for Portsmouth and Birmingham City in England.

Club career

Early career
At the age of 16 he played youth football for Fyllingen. After two seasons in Vadmyra IL, where he played both junior and senior football, he returned to Fyllingen, this time in the senior team.

Brann
Huseklepp played in the Norwegian Second Division in 2004 and the first half of 2005, but left on 10 August to sign for Brann, because he was not given a place in the junior squad. He scored nineteen seconds into his first league match as a starter, and subsequently became a first team regular.

In 2006, Huseklepp had a hard time making the first team, starting just six games in the Norwegian Premier League and being substituted in all of them. The 2007 season was much the same, with Brann coach Mons Ivar Mjelde preferring to use Huseklepp as an impact player, taking on tiring defenders in the closing stages of the game. Huseklepp signalled that he would not sign a new contract with Brann, and as he has made himself a name as a flamboyant and technically gifted winger, a number of clubs were interested in signing the player. However, in November 2007, Huseklepp signed a new three-year contract with Brann. The team became league champions that year.

Bari
In January 2011 he completed a move to Serie A club Bari for  He played 14 games and scored two goals for the club, but they were relegated to Serie B and due to financial difficulties were forced to put Huseklepp up for sale.

Portsmouth
On 16 August 2011, Huseklepp signed a three-year contract with English Championship (second-tier) club Portsmouth; the fee was reported as £1.5 million. He made his debut in a 0–0 draw with Bristol City, replacing Liam Lawrence in the 87th minute. He scored his first goal against Blackpool on 24 September with a stoppage-time winner. Three days later he scored a last-minute own goal that made Portsmouth lose 3–2 at home to Peterborough United. He then scored two goals against Nottingham Forest in a 3–0 win on 5 November. On 28 January 2012, Huseklepp scored two goals in a 3–0 victory against Peterborough United.

Birmingham City
With Portsmouth in administration, the club informed Huseklepp that they needed him to accept a loan move to Championship rivals Birmingham City in order to help relieve their financial difficulties. Although reluctant to leave Portsmouth, where he had established a good relationship with the fans, he complied with the request, and joined Birmingham on 23 February 2012 on loan until the end of the season. He made his debut for the club a couple of days later in a 2–1 defeat at home to Nottingham Forest.

Return to Brann
After the Birmingham loan expired, Huseklepp could not gain a deal with Blues, and returned to Portsmouth, with his club suffering relegation. As the club was in administration, he was linked with various clubs, most of them from his homeland. Brann was the most hopeful ahead the deal, and was appealing for sponsorship to sign the player. After the departure of Rodolph Austin to Leeds United, the Norwegian club provided funds, and on 28 July 2012, it was announced that Brann had reached a verbal agreement with Huseklepp. Huseklepp changed shirt-number ahead of the 2013 season to number 23, which was used by Tomasz Sokolowski the previous season. The change was part of a sponsor-agreement with Auto 23 who paid parts of the transfer-fee when Huseklepp returned to Brann.

Haugesund and loan to Åsane
For the 2017 season Huseklepp signed with Haugesund.

In July 2017 he joined Norwegian second-tier side Åsane on loan for the rest of the season. During the loan, he scored 6 goals in 12 matches.

Åsane
In November 2017, it was announced that Huseklepp had terminated his contract with Haugesund and signed permanently with Åsane.

Return to Fyllingen
Huseklepp went back to Fyllingen on 7 January 2019.

International career
On 12 August 2009, he scored his first international goal in the 60th minute of the 4–0 victory over Scotland, after strike partner John Carew had hit both posts. He was awarded Man of the Match by the viewers in his international debut which he played from the start. Huseklepp was the first player hailing from Bergen since 1963 to score for the national team. He scored the winning goal against Portugal during the UEFA Euro 2012 qualifying in a 1–0 win.

After he played his 25th match at international level against Cyprus in October 2011, Huseklepp also became the first player from Bergen to receive the Gold Watch since Helge Karlsen in 1977. As of February 2013, he has been capped 33 times for Norway, scoring seven goals.

Coaching career
Huseklepp was appointed as assistant coach at Brann on 5 January 2022, as part of the coaching staff under manager Eirik Horneland.

Career statistics

Club

International goals
Scores and results list Norway's goal tally first, score column indicates score after each Huseklepp goal.

Honours
Brann
Tippeligaen: 2007

References

1984 births
Living people
Footballers from Bergen
Association football forwards
Norwegian footballers
Norway international footballers
Norwegian expatriate footballers
Fyllingen Fotball players
SK Brann players
S.S.C. Bari players
Portsmouth F.C. players
Birmingham City F.C. players
FK Haugesund players
Åsane Fotball players
Eliteserien players
Serie A players
English Football League players
Expatriate footballers in Italy
Expatriate footballers in England
Norwegian expatriate sportspeople in Italy
Norwegian expatriate sportspeople in England